The third season of JAG premiered on CBS on September 23, 1997, and concluded on May 19, 1998. The season, starring David James Elliott and Catherine Bell, was produced by Belisarius Productions in association with Paramount Television.

Plot 

Lieutenant Commander Harmon "Harm" Rabb, Jr. (David James Elliott), a former aviator, and Marine Major Sarah "Mac" MacKenzie (Catherine Bell) work for the Headquarters of the Judge Advocate General, the internal law firm of the Department of the Navy. Mac, a beautiful, by-the-book Marine, is JAG's Chief of Staff and Harm's partner. She oversees a team including Lieutenant J.G. Bud Roberts (Patrick Labyorteaux), Ensign Harriet Sims (Karri Turner), and Commander Carolyn Imes (Dana Sparks), as they investigate cases including the discovery of a skeleton aboard a decommissioned ship ("Ghost Ship"), a fraternization charge ("The Court-Martial of Sandra Gilbert"), a training accident ("Blindside"), and a murder in Vietnam ("Vanished"). Meanwhile, Mac comes face-to-face with her past ("The Good of the Service"), and departs JAG for private-practice ("Impact"), Bud tries his hand at Karaoke ("Above and Beyond"), Harm is accused of murder ("People v. Rabb"), Harm and Mac travel to Russia ("To Russia With Love"), Rear Admiral A.J. Chegwidden (John M. Jackson) loses his mentor ("With Intent to Die"), and Mac learns of Lieutenant Diane Schonke ("Death Watch"), her doppelganger whose murder was investigated by Harm and Lieutenant Meg Austin (Tracey Needham) in 1996.

Production 
Despite an initial reluctance to co-operate from the United States Department of the Navy (due to sensitivity in light of all the accumulative negative publicity that had been generated from the Tailhook scandal and its aftermath), during season three, the naval services had begun to change their minds, and began to render support to the production team on a script-by-script basis. Commander Bob Anderson of the Navy's entertainment media liaison office in Los Angeles stated that "we're fine with that as long as the bad guys are caught and punished, and the institution of the Navy is not the bad guy".

Cast and characters

Main

Also starring 
 Karri Turner as Harriet Sims, Ensign

Recurring

Guest appearances

Episodes

Notes

References

External links 
 Season 3 on IMDb
 Season 3 on TV.com
 Season 3 on TV Guide

03
1997 American television seasons
1998 American television seasons